Mondo Mando is an all-instrumental album by American musician David Grisman, released in 1981.

Track listing 
All songs by David Grisman unless otherwise noted.
 "Cedar Hill" – 3:47
 "Dawg Funk" – 4:10
 "Japan (Op. 23)" – 3:37
 "Fanny Hill" – 3:09
 "Anouman" (Django Reinhardt) – 4:58
 "Caliente" – 7:29
 "Albuquerque Turkey" – 2:56
 "Mondo Mando" – 9:01

Personnel 

 David Grisman – mandolin
 Darol Anger – violin, mandolin
 Rob Wasserman – bass
 Mike Marshall – guitar, mandola
Technical
 Producer - David Grisman
 Executive Producer - Craig Miller
 Engineering - John Haeny
 Mastering - Greg Fulginiti

Chart positions

References 

1981 albums
David Grisman albums
Warner Records albums